Xiahou Dun (died 13 June 220), courtesy name Yuanrang, was a Chinese military general and politician serving under the warlord Cao Cao during the late Eastern Han dynasty of China. He served for a few months under Cao Cao's successor, Cao Pi, before his death. As one of Cao Cao's most trusted generals, Xiahou Dun aided the warlord in his campaigns against Lü Bu, Liu Bei, Sun Quan and others.

Xiahou Dun lost his left eye when he was a hit by a stray arrow during a battle against Lü Bu in the late 190s, and subsequently became known among the rank and file as "One-eyed Xiahou". His image as a one-eyed warrior was popularized by the 14th-century historical novel Romance of the Three Kingdoms, in which he yanked the arrow out of his eye and devoured his eyeball.

Early life
Xiahou Dun was from Qiao County, Pei State, which is on present-day Bozhou, Anhui. He was a descendant of Xiahou Ying, who served under the Han dynasty's founding emperor, Liu Bang (Emperor Gao) and though the family didn't reach national prominence in the centuries since, they were a leading family in Pei, often intermarrying down the generations with other prominent local clans the Dings and the Caos. Xiahou Dun first gained prominence when he killed a man who insulted his teacher when he was 13 years old.

In the 180s, possibly when Cao Cao was appointed Cavalry Commandant to help fight Yellow Turbans in Yingchuan, Xiahou Dun helped raise troops and from then on, would follow him across many a battle as his second in command. In 190, when Cao Cao was raising an army to participate in the campaign against Dong Zhuo, Xiahou Dun became his Major and when they defeated by Xu Rong at Suanzao, Xiahou Dun went with Cao Cao to recruit more troops in Yang province, though they would face a mutiny among their new soldiers. Xiahou Dun was sent to garrison Boma (白馬; near present-day Hua County, Henan), later promoted to Colonel Who Breaks and Charges and as Cao Cao became Governor of Yan in 192, succeeded him as the Administrator of Dong Commandery (東郡; the areas around present-day Puyang, Henan and Liaocheng, Shandong).

Defence of Yan Province

In 193, Cao Cao left his base in Yan Province on a campaign against Tao Qian, the Governor of Xu Province, whom he held responsible for the murder of his father Cao Song. Xiahou Dun was left behind in Dong commandery, stationed to hold its capital Puyang.

While Cao Cao was away in Xu Province, his subordinates Zhang Miao and Chen Gong rebelled in Yan Province and invited the warlord Lü Bu to take Yan but Zhang Miao's attempt to reassure Xun Yu of Lü Bu's intent instead tipped off Xun Yu of the revolt so Xun Yu wrote to Xiahou Dun for reinforcements to Juancheng County. Xiahou Dun led a lightly armed force towards Juancheng but he encountered Lü Bu's army on the way and engaged the enemy in battle. Lü Bu withdrew his forces and took advantage of Xiahou Dun's absence to conquer Puyang, capturing much of Xiahou's supplies and equipment. Lü Bu later sent his men to pretend to surrender to Xiahou Dun, who fell for the ruse and was taken hostage by the enemy in his own camp. Lü Bu's men demanded a heavy ransom. Xiahou Dun's troops became fearful and confused when they heard that their commander had been taken hostage. Xiahou Dun's personally recruited subordinate Han Hao settled the troops then ordered an attack on the surprised hostages takers who surrendered, Han Hao ordered them executed and Xiahou Dun was saved.

Xiahou Dun, mishap dealt with, continued to lead his forces eastwards to Juancheng, reinforcing the small garrison there with some officials and members of the garrison plotted joining the revolt. That night, Xiahou Dun executed the plotters and settled the army. He also urged Xun Yu not to go to meet the wavering Inspector of Yu Guo Gong and his army as Xun Yu was too important but Xun Yu went and was able to persuade Guo Gong to withdraw. Xiahou Dun would be a core part of the Cao loyalists holding the slim remaining holdings in the eastern part of Yan, he and Xun Yu sending the local Cheng Yu to encourage Fan and Dong'e to hold out.

When Cao Cao learned of the rebellion, he withdrew his army from Xu Province and returned to Yan Province to attack Lü Bu. Xiahou Dun participated in the camapign against Lü Bu, and was hit in the left eye by a stray arrow during a skirmish. After the loss of his left eye, when Dun and his cousin Xiahou Yuan had both reached the rank of General (putting this from 209 onwards), he was given the nickname "One-eyed Xiahou" in Cao Cao's army. Xiahou Dun hated this nickname and he would throw a mirror to the ground whenever he saw his own reflection. Lü Bu and Cao Cao fought near Puyang for over 100 days, with Xiahou Dun's Major Dian Wei catching Cao Cao's eye, but famine cost Lü Bu momentum and in 195, Cao Cao drove Lü Bu out of Yan.

Mid-career

Xiahou Dun was appointed as the Administrator of Chenliu (陳留; around present-day Kaifeng, Henan) commandery, the area once under Zhang Miao's control, where had a falling out with his Reporting Officer Wei Zhen around 200. Xiahou Dun invited Wei Zhen to bring his wife out to the feast, to which Wei Zhen strongly objected to as inappropriate to the fury of Xiahou Dun who had his subordinate jailed but soon released him. Then to Jiyin (濟陰; near present-day Dingtao County, Shandong) commandery, and held the rank of General Who Builds Martial Might. He was also enfeoffed as the Marquis of Gao'an District. While he was in office, a drought broke out and there was a locust infestation in the region. To counter these problems, Xiahou Dun spearheaded an agricultural program, in which he instructed workers to dam up the Taishou River (太壽水; a tributary of the Huai River) to create a large pond. He personally participated in the construction works and also encouraged the people to grow crops in the inundated land. This program greatly aided the people during those years of severe famine. He was later reassigned to be the Intendant of Henan. In 198 Xiahou Dun was dispatched to Xu to reinforce the allied Liu Bei, who was under attack from Gao Shun on the orders of Lü Bu, but Gao Shun defeated Xiahou Dun then would drive out Liu Bei.

Xiahou Dun did not participate in Cao Cao's campaigns in northern China against Yuan Shao, Yuan's sons and their allies throughout the 200s CE. Instead, he held Henan, possibly the camapign being the put where he was made Intendant of Henan, helping keep Cao Cao's western flank secure. In 202, Cao Cao's rival Liu Bei, who had sought refuge under Jing Province's governor Liu Biao, launched a series of raids into Cao Cao's lands. In response, Cao Cao sent Xiahou Dun, Yu Jin and Li Dian to lead an army to resist Liu Bei, both sides clashed at the Battle of Bowang. Liu Bei burnt his camps and feigned retreat to lure the enemy into an ambush. Xiahou Dun and his men fell for the trick and were defeated in the ambush. Li Dian, who warned Xiahou Dun about the danger of an ambush and did not join in the pursuit, led reinforcements to help Xiahou Dun and Yu Jin. Liu Bei withdrew his forces after seeing Li Dian's approach and the raid stropped.

After the Battle of Ye in 204, Xiahou Dun was promoted to General Who Calms the Waves but retained his appointment as the Intendant of Henan with the freedom to act on his own initiative without being restricted by regulations. In 205, Gao Gan encouraged revolts in Hedong with Wei Gu holding the Shan crossing and local loyal forces unable to cross, Xiahou Dun was sent but before he could arrive, Du Ji persuaded Xiahou Dun to let him go across with a small escort and plot with the local loyalists. On 21 March 207, as Cao Cao prepared to attack the remnants of the Yuan family, he rewarded 20 of his officers with greater enoffments with Xiahou Dun granted an additional 1,800 taxable households in his marquisate in recognition of his contributions, bringing the total number of households to 2,500. Xiahou Dun befriended Tian Chou and would be sent by Cao Cao to, unsuccessfully, persuade Tian Chou to take up honors for his service In 213, Xiahou Dun would be one of the signatories calling for Cao Cao to become Duke of Wei.

Later life and death
Xiahou Dun accompanied the 215 campaign in Hanzhong against the theocratic warlord Zhang Lu but Cao Cao's forces struggled against Zhang Wei's forces. According to Dong Zhao's account, Cao Cao issued orders to recall with Xiahou Dun and Xu Chu were sent to bring the troops back from the hills. In the confusion, some of the returning troops got lost in the night and surprised some of the defenders who fled from their position. This was reported back to Xiahou Dun and, with some not believing it, Xiahou Dun rode forward to see for himself then went back to tell Cao Cao so they could exploit it, Zhang Wei's position collapsed and Zhang Lu soon surrendered. In 216, he accompanied Cao Cao to Juchao (居巢; in present-day Chaohu, Anhui) against southern rival Sun Quan but met with stalemate. In 217, Cao Cao withdrew but left behind Xiahou Dun as Area Commander in command of 26 juns until Sun Quan negotiated terms including an acceptance of Cao Cao as King. As a reward for his contributions including at Juchao, he received a number of performing dancers and musicians. The imperial order that came with the reward read: "When Wei Jiang (魏絳) pacified the Rong people, he was only rewarded with gold and riches. Don't you, General, deserve more than him?"

In 219, when Cao Cao marched to Mobei (摩陂; southeast of present-day Jia County, Henan) in response to Guan Yu's attack, he treated Xiahou Dun with exceptional honors that no other officer received, by letting Xiahou ride in the same carriage and allowing Xiahou to enter Cao Cao's private quarters. At the time, Emperor Xian had made Cao Cao a vassal king under the title "King of Wei" and granted him permission to set up an independent vassal kingdom, which was still nominally under Han imperial control. While many of Cao Cao's subordinates had been appointed to positions in his vassal kingdom, Xiahou Dun still held appointments under the Han central government. Xiahou Dun requested to serve in Cao Cao's vassal kingdom to show his loyalty, but Cao Cao told him, "I heard that the best rulers learn from their subjects while the second best befriend their subjects. Officials are noble men of virtue. Why lower yourself to serve such a small kingdom like Wei?" Xiahou Dun insisted, so Cao Cao appointed him as General of the Vanguard. Xiahou Dun then returned soldiers to Shouchun and later garrisoned at Zhaoling.

Around late 219, Xiahou Dun, along with Chen Qun, Huan Jie and others, urged Cao Cao to take the throne from Emperor Xian. Xiahou Dun said, "Everyone in the Empire knows that the Han dynasty's lifespan has come to an end and that there are many contenders seeking to replace it. Since ancient times, whoever succeeds in eliminating the people's troubles will win the hearts of the people and become their ruler. As of now, Your Highness has been fighting battles for over 30 years, you've made outstanding achievements and the hearts of the people are with you. You should follow the will of Heaven and the people. What's there to hesitate about?" Cao Cao replied, "'These qualities are displayed in government. This then also constitutes the exercise of government.' If the Mandate of Heaven does belong to me, I'll be like King Wen of Zhou."

Cao Cao died in early 220 and passed on his vassal king title to his son, Cao Pi, who was still a nominal subject of Emperor Xian. Xiahou Dun was promoted to General-in-Chief on 23 April. He died some months later on 13 June with Cao Pi leading mourning at Ye's east gate

The Cao Man Zhuan and the Shiyu mentioned that Xiahou Dun once suggested to Cao Cao to eliminate Liu Bei first in order to force Sun Quan to surrender of his own accord, and then follow in the footsteps of the mythological rulers Shun and Yu by making Emperor Xian voluntarily abdicate the throne to him. Cao Cao accepted his proposal. After Cao Cao's death, Xiahou Dun regretted his words and fell sick and died. The historian Sun Sheng dismissed the Shiyu account as nonsense, saying that it did not match what was recorded in the main text of Xiahou Dun's biography in the Sanguozhi – Xiahou Dun felt ashamed of serving under the Han imperial court so he requested to serve in Cao Cao's vassal kingdom.

Family

In late 220, Cao Pi forced Emperor Xian to abdicate the throne in his favour and established the state of Cao Wei, marking the end of the Han dynasty and the start of the Three Kingdoms period.

Cao Pi granted Xiahou Dun the posthumous title "Marquis Zhong", which literally means "loyal marquis". Xiahou Dun's original marquis title, "Marquis of Gao'an District", was inherited by his son, Xiahou Chong. Later, in recognition of Xiahou Dun's past contributions, Cao Pi added 1,000 taxable households to Xiahou Chong's marquisate and made each of Xiahou Dun's seven sons and two grandsons a Secondary Marquis. Cao Rui on 7 June 233 started sacrifices at the Ancestral Temple to a few select figures who had helped create a dynasty, Xiahou Dun was one of the three.

Xiahou Dun's younger brother, Xiahou Lian, was also enfeoffed as a marquis. Xiahou Dun's second son, Xiahou Mao, married one of Cao Cao's daughters, Princess Qinghe, and held high-ranking positions in the Wei imperial court. Xiahou Dun also had two other sons—Xiahou Zizang and Xiahou Zijiang.

When Xiahou Chong died, his marquis title was inherited by his son, Xiahou Yu. Xiahou Yu, in turn, was succeeded by his son Xiahou Shao. According to the Jin Yang Qiu, Xiahou Dun did not have any successor after his grandson, Xiahou Zuo, died in 266 but the last Cao Wei Emperor Cao Huan ordered that kinsman be found to continue the line of such a distinguished servant in Cao Wei's founding.

Appraisal
Although Xiahou Dun was often traveling as a soldier, he ensured he had teachers come to help him study. He led a frugal and simple lifestyle and used his excess wealth to help the needy. He took from official treasuries (instead of directly from the common people) when he did not have enough money. He also did not own much property.

In Records of the Three Kingdoms In Plain Language 
From a work in the 13th century, as part of a series of historical fiction, he serves as a brave warrior who is prone to being lured into fake retreat duels. First appears when Zhang Fei arrives in Cao Cao's camp, for the second time, seeking help against Lü Bu. Xiahou Dun calls out to Zhang Fei and was delighted to get a meeting, appointed vanguard. Duels Lü Bu who faked defeat and when Xiahou Dun pursued, shot Xiahou Dun in the left eye. Dismounting, Xiahou Dun pulled out the arrow with the famous line, held the eye in the his mouth and returns to fighting an astonished Lü Bu who is forced to retreat.

Xiahou Dun survived longer in the this work then he did historically. In Zhuge Liang's first of his northern camapigns, Xiahou Dun held the key pass at Jieting and heard Jiang Wei had placed his camp in a dangerous position. Only worried about Zhuge Liang, he considered Jiang Wei a stupid little boy and launched a surprise attack at night only to fall into an ambush led by Wei Yan, Xiahou Dun fled with Jieting lost. At Chang'an, he informed Emperor Cao Fang who would appoint Sima Yi to oppose Zhuge Liang.

In Romance of the Three Kingdoms
Xiahou Dun is featured as a character in the 14th-century historical novel Romance of the Three Kingdoms, which romanticises the historical events before and during the Three Kingdoms period.

See the following for some fictitious stories in Romance of the Three Kingdoms involving Xiahou Dun:
 Battle of Xiapi#Xiahou Dun losing his left eye
 Battle of Bowang#In fiction

In popular culture

Xiahou Dun is featured as a playable character in Koei's Dynasty Warriors video game series, as well as Warriors Orochi, a crossover between Dynasty Warriors and Samurai Warriors. He also appears in all installments of Koei's Romance of the Three Kingdoms strategy game series.

There is a card based on Xiahou Dun, called "Xiahou Dun, the One-Eyed", in the Portal Three Kingdoms set of the Magic: The Gathering collectible card game.

The anime Battle Vixens, Koihime Musō, and Yuyushiki also make references to Xiahou Dun, in which he is known by his Japanese name "Kakōton".

Xiahou Dun also appears as a playable character in Total War: Three Kingdoms, and is prominently featured in the game as a general in the service of Cao Cao.

See also
 Lists of people of the Three Kingdoms

Notes

References

 Chen, Shou (3rd century). Records of the Three Kingdoms (Sanguozhi).
 
 Luo, Guanzhong (14th century). Romance of the Three Kingdoms (Sanguo Yanyi).
 Pei, Songzhi (5th century). Annotations to Records of the Three Kingdoms (Sanguozhi zhu).
 Yu family (13th Century) Records in Plain Language (Sanguozhi Pinghua)

Year of birth unknown
220 deaths
Chinese people with disabilities
Han dynasty politicians from Anhui
Han dynasty generals from Anhui
Politicians from Bozhou
Generals under Cao Cao
Officials under Cao Cao
Cao Cao and associates
People during the end of the Han dynasty